Maglie is a railway station in Maglie, Italy. The station is located on the Lecce–Otranto railway and Maglie-Gagliano del Capo railway. The train services and the railway infrastructure are operated by Ferrovie del Sud Est.

Train services
The station is served by the following service(s):

Local services (Treno regionale) Zollino - Maglie - Tricase - Gagliano
Local services (Treno regionale) Maglie - Otranto

References

Railway stations in Apulia
Buildings and structures in the Province of Lecce
Maglie